The Piz is a right tributary of the river Buy in Perm Krai, the Republic of Bashkortostan and the Republic of Udmurtia, Russia. It starts in the Yelovsky District of Perm Krai, then flows through Chaikovsky District on the border with Bashkortostan. It empties into the Buy on the border between the Udmurt Republic and Bashkortostan,  from the larger river's mouth.

Main tributaries:
Left: Bolshaya Usa
Right: Posha

References 

Rivers of Perm Krai
Rivers of Bashkortostan
Rivers of Udmurtia